Tokaj is a historical town in Borsod-Abaúj-Zemplén county, Northern Hungary, 54 kilometers from county capital Miskolc. It is the centre of the Tokaj-Hegyalja wine district where Tokaji wine is produced.

History 

The wine-growing area was first mentioned by the name Tokaj in 1067. The town itself was first mentioned in documents in 1353. Its first castle was a motte, which was destroyed during the Mongol invasion of Hungary. By the 14th century, the town already had a stone castle, belonging to the Diósgyőr estate.

After 1450, Tokaj was the property of the Hunyadi family, so after Matthias Hunyadi became king, the town became a royal estate. In 1526, after the Ottomans captured Petervarad (modern day Petrovaradin, Serbia), Cistercians from Petervarad and its surroundings relocated to Tokaj and greatly improved wine making in the area. In 1705, Francis II Rákóczi ordered the castle to be destroyed.

After the Austro-Hungarian Compromise of 1867, the town prospered, but when the World Wars came, it suffered greatly, losing its importance and town status. Even its role in wine trade was taken over by Sátoraljaújhely.

Tokaj was granted town status again in 1986 and it again started to prosper. Now,the town is a popular tourist attraction.

Tokaj wine region 

Tokaj wine region is a historical wine region located in northeastern Hungary and southeastern Slovakia. It is one of the seven larger wine regions of Hungary (Hungarian: Tokaji borrégió). Hegyalja means "foothills" in Hungarian, and this was the original name of the region.

The region consists of 28 named villages and 11,149 hectares of classified vineyards, of which an estimated 5,500 are currently planted. Tokaj has been declared a World Heritage Site in 2002 under the name Tokaj Wine Region Historic Cultural Landscape. However, its fame long predated this distinction because it is the origin of Tokaji aszú wine, the world's oldest botrytized wine.

Twin towns – sister cities

Tokaj is twinned with:

 Binyamina-Giv'at Ada, Israel
 Cormons, Italy
 Dej, Romania
 Iwonicz-Zdrój, Poland

 Oestrich-Winkel, Germany
 Rust, Austria
 Sonoma, United States
 Supetar, Croatia

Main sights 

 Main square with City hall; the Bacchus fountain; the Catholic Church; and other monuments
 Roman Catholic Church
 Tokaj Gallery (former Orthodox church—government has announced intentions to restore)
 Tokaj Museum (Karácsony house)
 Wine cellars
 Rákóczi-Dessewffy castle
 Tisza bridge
 Synagogue
 Tokaj open stage (″Fesztivalkatlan″)

External links

  in Hungarian
 Tokaj and the Historic Wine Region - tourism information

References

Populated places in Borsod-Abaúj-Zemplén County